Beat Happening is the debut album by Beat Happening, released in 1985 through K Records. It was produced by Greg Sage, singer and guitarist for post-punk band Wipers.

Track listing
All songs written by Calvin Johnson, Bret Lunsford, and Heather Lewis.

Original 1985 tracklist

Reissues
In 1986, the album was reissued with "Our Secret" and "What's Important", the two tracks from Beat Happening's first single. These were placed as the fourth and fifth track, with "fourteen" and "Bad Seeds (live)" pushed to the sixth and seventh place on the same side.

The album has been reissued multiple times since its initial release with slightly altering track listings, sometimes under the title "1983-85". The version with the most comprehensive tracklist is the initial 1990 CD on the Feel Good All Over label, which bears the following track list:

1983-85

Notes:
 1-4 produced by Greg Sage, Dec. 11, 1983, Young Pioneers' practice room, the old Fire House.
 5, 7, 8, 10 recorded Nov. 27, 1983, Ray Apts. number three.
 6 live broadcast, Dec. 11, 1983, KAOS-FM.
 9 recorded by Rich Jensen, Jan. 1984, 13th Precinct, Portland, Or
 11, 12, 14, 15 recorded Spring 1984, Nakameguro, Tokyo, Japan, and 13 recorded April 4, 1984, Takashimadaira, Tokyo, Japan
 These five tracks were taken from the band's 1984 EP "Three Tea Breakfast"
 16-20 produced by Greg Sage, Nov. 1984, YoYo Studio.
 16 originally appeared on K Records compilation cassette, "Let's Together"
 21 recorded late Fall 1984, Thompson Apts.
 22 produced by Patrick Maley, Nov. 1984, the Recital Hall.
 23-26 recorded Feb. 13, 1985, Martin Apts. number twelve
 23 originally appeared on K Records compilation cassette, "Let's Kiss"
 24 originally titled as "One Two Three" and appeared on K Records compilation cassette, "Let's Sea"

Personnel
Adapted from original LP liner notes.
 Calvin Johnson – guitar and vocals
 Heather Lewis – drums, guitar, and vocals
 Bret Lunsford – guitar and drums
 Greg Sage – producer
 Pat Maley – producer, bongos on "Bad Seeds"

References

External links
[  Beat Happening on AMG]

Beat Happening albums
K Records albums
1985 debut albums